José Ariel Reyes Ramírez (born February 26, 1983, in Barahona, Dominican Republic) is a former Major League Baseball catcher. He is not related to All-Star shortstop José Reyes.

Career
He posted a .200 batting average (1-for-5) with two RBI in four games.

References

External links

1983 births
Arizona League Cubs players
Chicago Cubs players
Daytona Cubs players
Dominican Republic expatriate baseball players in the United States
Iowa Cubs players
Lansing Lugnuts players

Living people
Major League Baseball catchers
Major League Baseball players from the Dominican Republic
West Tennessee Diamond Jaxx players